New York's 63rd State Assembly district is one of the 150 districts in the New York State Assembly. It has been represented by Republican Sam Pirozzolo since 2023, succeeding Michael Cusick, who retired in 2022.

Geography
The district consists of neighborhoods within western and central Staten Island, such as Todt Hill, Chelsea, and New Springville.

Recent election results

2022

2020

2018

2016

2014

2012

2010

References

63